Congress of Lushnjë Museum is a museum in Lushnjë, Albania. The Congress of Lushnjë was held here in 1920. In 1970, the building was turned into a museum devoted to patriotism. It contains numerous photographs and original documents related to Albania's struggle against Fascism. The white building has 5 bays on the middle floor and 2 bays on the top floor.

References

H
History museums in Albania
Museums established in 1970
Buildings and structures in Lushnjë
Tourist attractions in Fier County